Tijovac (Svrljig)   is a village in the municipality of Svrljig, Serbia. According to the 2002 census, the village has a population of 118 people.

References

Populated places in Nišava District